This is a list of education institutions in Shillong, India.

Institutes

English and Foreign Languages University
Indian Institute of Management Shillong
Indian Institute of Professional Studies
Martin Luther Christian University
National Institute of Fashion Technology Shillong
National Institute of Technology Meghalaya
North Eastern Hill University
North Eastern Indira Gandhi Regional Institute of Health and Medical Sciences
Northeastern Institute of Computer Technology
Techno Global University
University of Technology and Management

General degree colleges

KL Bajoria College
Lady Keane College
Shillong Law College
St. Mary's College
Shillong College
Shillong Commerce College
Shillong Polytechnic
St. Anthony's College
St. Dominic College
St. Edmund's College
Synod College

Other important schools and colleges

 BSF Senior Secondary School, Umpling
 Don Bosco Technical School
 Seven Set Higher Secondary School
 St. Anthony’s Higher Secondary School
 St. Edmund's School
 Pine Mount School

References 

Shillong educational institutions
Shillong educational institutions
Shillong
Shillong